Philip G. Bowker Overpass is a steel beam bridge with a suspended deck carrying The Charlesgate over Commonwealth Avenue, Beacon Street, and Interstate 90. It connects Boylston Street to Storrow Drive. It runs parallel to the Muddy River. In 2011, there was talk about tearing down the bridge and widening local streets as some consider the bridge to be an eyesore, as well as the fact that it bisects a portion of the Emerald Necklace.

Major intersections
The entire route is in Boston, Suffolk County.

References

External links
 

Bridges in Boston
Bridges completed in 1965
Road bridges in Massachusetts
1965 establishments in Massachusetts
Steel bridges in the United States